Demetrio, Re di Siria is an 1823 Italian language opera by Mayr, staged in Turin. It was Mayr's last opera, followed only by the Oratorio Gioas in 1824. The libretto is a revision of Metastasio's 1732 libretto originally set by Hasse.

Recordings
 Demetrio, Re di Siria, Amaya Domínguez - mezzo-soprano (Alceste/Demetrio), Bénédicte Tauran soprano (Cleonice), Piotr Friebe (Olinto), Elizabeth Bailey (Barsene), Lisandro Abadie (Fenicio), Matteo Mezzaro (Mitrane). Orchestre Symphonique du Jura, Opera Obliqua Stand de Moutier, Facundo Agudin. 2 CDs without libretto. Oehms 2013.

References

Operas
1823 operas
Operas by Simon Mayr